Smithfield State High School  is a secondary school located in Smithfield, Cairns, Queensland, Australia. Smithfield State High School operates as an independent public secondary school and is known for its unique partnership with Trinity Beach State School and James Cook University, through the Tropical North Learning Academy. The school attracts students primarily from the Cairns and tableland area.

As of 2020, there are about 1000 students (ranging from years 7 to 12) enrolled in the school.

History 
The school opened in 1983.

Trivia 
 The school's sporting mascot is a crocodile by the name of "Salty" In sporting events, students are placed into houses in which they remain until their departure from the school. The 4 are the Clifton Cobras [Clifton Beach] the Trinity Bulls [Trinity Beach] the Ellis Eagles [Ellis Beach] and the Kewarra Sharks. [Kewarra Beach]
 The school's extra curricular music program consists of a Concert Band and a Jazz Academy.
 The former principal Barry Courtney also went by the nickname "Bazza".
 A musical rehearsal space features a brick wall on which each brick has been painted over by a previous instrumental student.
 In 2019, a short-lived "Suhld Pinauz" club was founded by Year 12 students under the belief that the lab skeleton was a living entity that spat bile. It was disbanded when they graduated.
 It is a long lasting cultural feature among students and teachers to tell stories of paranormal activity. These include the "June Werewolves", the "JazzD Virus", the "Plaster Hand", and "The Ghost of Ler Warchild".
 The school will often use the neighboring YMCA to host events and parades.

See also
List of schools in Far North Queensland

References

Schools in Cairns
Public high schools in Queensland
Educational institutions established in 1983
1983 establishments in Australia